The Game Gadget is an open source gaming handheld that supports music and video playback, open game development, and some e-reader features.

History

Development
Initial development of the system occurred in the United Kingdom, and open source software was used to lower development costs. Production occurred outside the United Kingdom.

The system had an initial release date of March 30, 2012.

Release
It was released on April 5, 2012, The initial launch price of the system was to be £99.99 British pounds, though this price quickly dropped to a cost of £59.99 British pounds with those who paid the earlier price receiving a refund for £40. On launch the system's online activation system was incomplete, leading to issues. Following release, the system was transferred from Blaze to Xploder.

By October 2012 20,000 Game Gadget units were sold worldwide.

A Game Gadget 1.1, Game Gadget Pocket and Game Gadget 2.0 was planned.

The Game Gadget was eventually succeeded by the better received Evercade.

Specifications

Hardware
The Game Gadget made use of a dual core MIPS32 architecture Ingenic JZ4750 CPU, which was clocked at 433 Mhz. The system sported 64 megabytes of RAM. Storage consisted of 2 GB of internal flash, and a SD/SDHC for removable storage. There is no 3D acceleration hardware. The primary display was a 3.5" LCD with a 320x240 resolution and 16-bit color, though the system also supported TV-out. Additional outputs included stereo speakers, a headphone jack, and a micro USB port. Inputs included a D-Pad, 2 shoulder buttons, 4 face buttons, Start & Select buttons. A lithium-ion battery powered the system for approximately 8 hours.

It was only available in one colour, white.

Software

The Game Gadget ran an operating system based on Linux. A free official SDK was available. Officially supported development technologies included SDL, C, C++, Python 2.7, Ruby, and Lua.

Officially licensed Sega Mega Drive games were run with a version of the PicoDrive emulator. The system could run DRM protected software in a locked down mode, or community software in a "Sandbox" mode. An online store was used for digital distribution.

The system supported stereo playback of a number of audio codecs including MP3, WMA, APE, FLAC, WAV, AC3, MOD, S3M, XM and RealAudio. The system included a voice and radio recording application that supported MP3 and WAV formats. The system included a photo viewer that supports JPG, BMP, GIF, PNG file formats. An included text reader application supported TXT file formats in English and Chinese, as well as English text to speech. Further functions of the text reader include bookmarking, auto browsing, font sizing, and it can open while music is playing.

Two official firmware versions, V1.00 and v1.01, were released.

See also
Comparison of handheld game consoles
 Similar portable Linux-based gaming devices:
 GCW Zero
 GP32
 GP2X
 GP2X Wiz
 GP2X Caanoo
 Pandora (console)
 Mi2 console

External links 
 GameGadget Official Website (English, Archived)

References 

Seventh-generation video game consoles
Open hardware electronic devices
Handheld game consoles
MIPS-based video game consoles
Linux-based video game consoles